Oleksiy Tupchiy (born 22 August 1986) is a Ukrainian former professional footballer who spent his entire senior career in Belarus.

External links

1986 births
Living people
Ukrainian footballers
Association football midfielders
Ukrainian expatriate footballers
Expatriate footballers in Belarus
FC Dnepr Mogilev players
FC Vitebsk players
FC Belshina Bobruisk players
FC Gomel players
FC Shakhtyor Soligorsk players
FC Gorodeya players
FC Gorki players
FC Orsha players